Nikolas Koutsakos (born November 14, 2003) is a Cypriot professional footballer who plays as a forward for P.O. Xylotymbou on loan from APOEL

APOEL 
Nikolas Koutsakos made his debut for APOEL aged just 17 in a 0–1 loss against Olympiakos Nicosia coming on as a sub in the 77th minute for Mike Jensen. In 2020 he signed a 3-year deal with APOEL. He scored a hat-trick against Karmiotissa on 10 May 2021.

References 

2003 births
Living people
Sportspeople from Nicosia
Cypriot footballers
Association football forwards
APOEL FC players